The Shepherd of the Hills is a 1919 American silent drama film directed by Louis F. Gottschalk and Harold Bell Wright, and based on Bell Wright's 1909 novel of the same name. It was remade in 1941 by director Henry Hathaway.

Plot
A world-weary man arrives in a small Ozark town to atone for the wrongdoing of his son, who had a child with one of the town's residents and split town years earlier.

Cast
 Harry Lonsdale as The Shepherd
 Cathrine Curtis as Sammy Lane
 George A. McDaniel as Young Matt
 Don Bailey as Old Matt
 Elizabeth Rhodes as Aunt Molly
 Lon Poff as Jim Lane
 C. Edward Raynor as Little Pete
 Bert Sprotte as Wash Gibbs
 George Hackathorne as Ollie Stuart
 Louis Darclay as The Artist
 E.K. Kendall as Postmaster
 Ardita Mellinina as The Girl at the Spring (credited as Ardita Mellonino)
 William De Vaull as Doctor (credited as William P. Du Vaull)
 J. Edwin Brown as Uncle Ike

Production
Wright was heavily involved in the production of the film; he preferred to shoot the film as more of a traditional play rather than cutting in and using close-ups of the actors. He even cast a neighbor, Phoenix resident Cathrine Curtis, as his leading lady. The film was produced by the Clune Film Company over the course of several months spanning from 1917 to 1918, and was shot in California and the Ozark Mountains of Missouri.

References

External links

 
 
 
 

1919 films
Films based on American novels
Films set in the United States
American black-and-white films
American silent feature films
1910s American films